Islam's significance in Germany has largely increased after the labour migration in the 1960s and several waves of political refugees since the 1970s.

According to a representative survey, it is estimated that in 2019, there were 5.3–5.6 million Muslims with a migrant background in Germany (6.4–6.7% of the population), in addition to an unknown number of Muslims without a migrant background. A similar survey in 2016 estimated a number of 4.4–4.7 million Muslims with a migrant background (5.4–5.7% of the population) at that time. An older survey in 2009 estimated a total number of up to 4.3 Muslims in Germany at that time. There are also higher estimates: according to the German Islam Conference, Muslims represented 7% of the population in Germany in 2012.

In a 2014 academic publication it was estimated that some 100,000 Germans converted to Islam, numbers which are comparable to that in France and in the United Kingdom.

Demographics

Islam is the largest minority religion in the country, with the Protestant and Roman Catholic confessions being the majority religions.
Most Muslims in Germany have roots in Turkey, followed by Arab countries, former Yugoslavia (mostly of Kosovo-Albanian or Bosnian origin), Afghanistan and Iran. There are also a significant minority originated from Sub-Saharan Africa (mostly East Africa) and South Asia (mostly Pakistan). The large majority of Muslims live in former West Germany, including West Berlin. However, unlike in most other European countries, sizeable Muslim communities exist in some rural regions of Germany, especially Baden-Württemberg, Hesse and parts of Bavaria and North Rhine-Westphalia. Owing to the lack of labour immigration before 1989, there are only very few Muslims in the former East Germany. Among the German districts with the highest share of Muslim migrants are Groß-Gerau (district) and Offenbach (district) according to migrants data from the census 2011. The majority of Muslims in Germany are Sunnis, at 75%. There are Shia Muslims (7%) and mostly from Iran. The Ahmadiyya Muslim Community organization comprise a minority of Germany's Muslims, numbering some 35,000 members or a little over 1% of the Muslim population, and are found in 244 communities as of 2013.

From the mid-2000s to 2016 there has been a surge migrants to Germany from outside Europe. Of the 680,000 regular migrants, 270,000 were Muslim. Additionally, of the 1,210,000 asylum seekers, 900,000 were Muslim (around 74%). Of the asylum seekers, 580,000 applicants were approved and 320,000 were denied or expected to be denied. According to the Pew Research Center, similar patterns of Muslim migration to Germany should be expected in the future and the Muslim population share is expected to grow.

Prison population 
According to the Huffington Post in February 2018 which quired each of the 15 state justice ministries, 12,300 Muslims are in prison and constitute about 20% of the total 65,000 prison population in Germany which constitutes an over-representation. The highest shares are in city states of Bremen (29%), Hamburg (28%) but the share is high also in large states such as Hessen (26%) Baden-Württemberg (26%). The share is lower in the former East Germany.

History

Early history
Muslims first moved to Germany as part of the diplomatic, military and economic relations between Germany and the Ottoman Empire in the eighteenth century.  Twenty Muslim soldiers served under Frederick William I of Prussia, at the beginning of the eighteenth century.  In 1745, Frederick II of Prussia established a unit of Muslims in the Prussian army called the "Muslim Riders" and consisting mainly of Bosniaks, Albanians and Tatars. In 1760 a Bosnian Muslim corps was established with about 1,000 men. In 1798 a Muslim cemetery was established in Berlin.  The cemetery, which moved in 1866, still exists today. A number of German philosophers expressed sympathy for Islam, including Johann Wolfgang von Goethe (who particularly admired the Sufi poetry of Hafez) and later Friedrich Nietzsche (in The Antichrist, he claimed that the Germanic spirit was closer to the Moors of Al-Andalus than that of Greece, Rome and Christianity).

The German Empire had over two million Muslim subjects, mostly Sunnis, in overseas colonies. The Majority lived in German East Africa. Several Muslim revolts against German colonial rule occurred, including the Adamawa Campaign, Maji Maji Rebellion and Abushiri revolt.

1920s to the 1940s

The Islamic Institut Ma’ahad-ul-Islam was founded in 1927 and is now known under the name "Zentralinstitut Islam-Archiv-Deutschland" (Central Islamic Archive Institute) and is the oldest such institution in Germany. Shortly after its founding the Nazi Party came to power the archive was forced to suspend all further work, until after the war.
During World War II Grand Mufti of Jerusalem Haj Amin al-Husseini energetically recruited Muslims from occupied territories into several divisions of the Waffen SS (primarily the 13th Waffen Mountain Division of the SS Handschar (1st Croatian) and 21st Waffen Mountain Division of the SS Skanderbeg) and some other units.

Post-war Germany
After the West German Government invited foreign workers ("Gastarbeiter") in 1961, the figure sharply rose to currently 4.3 million (most of them Turkish from the rural region of Anatolia in southeast Turkey). They are sometimes called a parallel society within ethnic Germans.

According to the German statistical office 9.1% of all newborns in Germany had Muslim parents in 2005.

In 2017, Muslims and Islamic institutions were targeted by attacks 950 times, where houses are painted with Nazi symbols, hijab-wearing women are harassed, threatening letters are sent and 33 people were injured. In nearly all cases, the perpetrators were right-wing extremists.

In May 2018 a court in Berlin upheld the right to the state's neutrality principle by barring a primary school teacher from wearing a headscarf during classes, where the court spokesman stated that children should be free of the influence that can be exerted by religious symbols.

According to a study in 2018 by Leipzig University, 56% of Germans sometimes thought the many Muslims made them feel like strangers in their own country, up from 43% in 2014. In 2018, 44% thought immigration by Muslims should be banned, up from 37% in 2014.

In December 2018, the government of Germany strengthened the control of Saudi, Kuwaiti and Qatari funding for radical mosque congregations. The measure was recommended by an anti-terrorist agency in Berlin (German: Terrorismus-Abwehrzentrum) which since 2015 had started to monitor Safalist proselytizing funding in the wake of the European migrant crisis to prevent refugees from becoming radicalized. Henceforth Gulf authorities are required to report payments and funding to the German Federal Foreign Office (German: Auswärtiges Amt).

In December 2018, there were no official statistics on how much funding mosques in Germany received from abroad.

In July 2020, federal state Baden-Württemberg banned face-covering veils for school pupils as an extension of the ban which was already in force for staff.

Denominations

Muslims in Germany belong to several different branches of Islam (approximate data):

Sunnis 2,640,000
Alevis 500,000
Twelvers Shi'as 225,500
Alawites 70,000
Ahmadiyya 35,000-45,000
Salafis 10,300
Sufis 10,000
Ismailis 1,900
Zaydis 800
Ibadis 270

Islamic organisations
Only a minority of the Muslims residing in Germany are members of religious associations.

Sunni
Diyanet İşleri Türk İslam Birliği (DİTİB): German branch of the Turkish Presidency for Religious Affairs, Cologne. As of 2016, the Turkish government funds and provides staff for 900 of Germany's roughly 3000 mosques run by DİTİB.
Islamische Gemeinschaft Milli Görüş: close to the Islamist Saadet Partisi in Turkey, Kerpen near Cologne
Islamische Gemeinschaft Jamaat un-Nur (de): German branch of the Risale-i Nur Society (Said Nursi)
Islamische Gemeinschaft in Deutschland organization of Arab Muslims close to the Muslim Brotherhood, Frankfurt

In addition there are numerous local associations without affiliation to any of these organisations. Two organisations have been banned in 2002 because their programme was judged as contrary to the constitution: The "Hizb ut-Tahrir" and the so-called "Caliphate State" founded by Cemalettin Kaplan and later led by his son Metin Kaplan.

Shia
Islamische Gemeinschaft der schiitischen Gemeinden Deutschlands (IGS): Head organization that unite all Shiite mosques and associations in Germany, with being the Islamic Centre Hamburg the most important Shia mosque in Germany.
Al-Mustafa Institut Berlin: A branch of the Al-Mustafa International University in Qum, Iran to Islamic theology to students in Germany and Europe.

Ahmadiyya
 Ahmadiyya Muslim Jamaat Deutschland K.d.ö.R.: German branch of the worldwide Ahmadiyya  Community. There is no ethnicity or race associated with this community although most of the members of the community residing in Germany are of Pakistani origin.  The Ahmadiyya  Community was established in Germany in 1923 in Berlin and is one of the largest in Europe.  Communities exist in Baden-Württemberg, Lower Saxony, North Rhine-Westphalia, Hesse and Bremen.
 Lahore Ahmadiyya Movement: German branch of the worldwide Lahore Ahmadiyya Movement.

Liberal Islam
 Ibn Ruschd-Goethe mosque in Berlin was founded by Seyran Ateş. The liberal mosque has been condemned by the Turkish religious authority and the Egyptian Fatwa Council at the Al-Azhar University.
Ibn Rushd Prize for Freedom of Thought

Wahhabism 
 King Fahd Academy, sponsored by Saudi Arabia. The school was closed at the end of the 2016/2017 school year, after long-running criticism that it was attracting Islamists to Germany.
 According to the FFGI at Goethe University Frankfurt, wahhabist ideology is spread in Germany as in other European country mostly by an array of informal, personal and organisational networks, where organisations closely associated with the government of Saudi Arabia such as the Muslim World League (WML) and the World Association of Muslim Youth are actively participating.

Others
 Verband der islamischen Kulturzentren: German branch of the conservative Süleymancı sect in Turkey, Cologne
 Verband der Islamischen Gemeinden der Bosniaken: Bosnian Muslims, Kamp-Lintfort near Duisburg
 Zentralinstitut Islam-Archiv-Deutschland e.V. : Documentary of Islamic Foundation-writings since 1739. The Islamic Institute was founded in 1942 (Sooner called Ma’ahad-ul-Islam Institut).

Umbrella organisations
Furthermore, there are the following umbrella organisations:
 Central Council of Muslims in Germany (Zentralrat der Muslime in Deutschland)
 Islamic Council in Germany (Islamrat in Deutschland)

Education 
 The A-Nur-Kita preschool was closed in February 2019 due to its parent organisation, the mosque association Arab Nil Rhein in Mainz propagated material from the Muslim Brotherhood and salafist ideology. Therefore, the parent association was incompatible with the constitution of Germany. This was the first time authorities closed any preschool in Rhineland-Palatinate (German: Rheinland-Pfalz). A-Nur-Kita was the first and only Muslim preschool in Rhineland-Palatinate.

Controversies
As elsewhere in Western Europe, the rapid growth of the Muslim community in Germany has led to social tensions and political controversy, partly connected to Islamic extremism, and more generally due to the perceived difficulties of multiculturalism and fears of Überfremdung.

Antisemitism 

A 2012 poll showed that 18% of the Turks in Germany think of Jews as inferior human beings. A similar study found that most of Germany's native born Muslim youth and children of immigrants have antisemitic views.

A 2017 study on Jewish perspectives on antisemitism in Germany by Bielefeld University found that individuals and groups belonging to the extreme right and extreme left were equally represented as perpetrators of antisemitic harassment and assault, while the largest part of the attacks were committed by Muslim assailants. The study also found that 70% of the participants feared a rise in antisemitism due to immigration citing the antisemitic views of the refugees. Many of this started in 2015 when a large quantity of islamic refugees entered Germany.

According to the Federal Office for the Protection of the Constitution, the majority of Islamist organizations in Germany cultivate antisemitic propaganda and distribute it in various ways.

In the education system

One such issue concerns the wearing of the head-scarf by teachers in schools and universities. The right to practice one's religion, stated by the teachers in question, contradicts in the view of many the neutral stance of the state towards religion. As of 2006, many of the German federal states have introduced legislation banning head-scarves for teachers. However, such a ban in North-Rhein Westphalia was declared as unconstitutional in 2015 by the Federal Constitutional Court.

In the German federal states with the exception of Bremen, Berlin and Brandenburg, lessons of religious education overseen by the respective religious communities are taught as an elective subject in state schools. It is being discussed whether apart from the Catholic and Protestant (and in a few schools, Jewish) religious education that currently exists, a comparable subject of Islamic religious education should be introduced as a regular part of the curricula. In several states, trials for Islamic religious education are being conducted, while in the states of Hessen, Lower-Saxony and Northrhine-Westphalia, Islamic religious education already is integrated as a regular class. The problem that the cooperation with Islamic organisations is hampered by the fact that none of them can be considered as representative of the whole Muslim community.

The discussion of religious (Islamic) education in German schools started in the 1970s, and also symmetrically with issues of Qur'anic classes as well as its deterrent effects on the integration of Turkish students into the country.

Construction of mosques and other projects
The construction of mosques is occasionally resisted by anti Muslim reactions in the neighborhoods concerned. For example, in 2007 an attempt by Muslims to build a large mosque in Cologne sparked a controversy.

Similarly with the Sendlinger Mosque Controversy, and the proposed construction of a training academy in Munich, originally called the "Centre for Islam in Europe, Munich" (ZIE-M), and later the "Munich Forum for Islam".

There are now 18 official mosques in the country that have been established as mosques since time immemorial. Muslim places of worship (such as mosques and other places of worship) are estimated at between 1,000 and 1,200. Most of these mosques are temporarily built and are mostly located in rented places, factories or warehouses. According to the archives of the Central Institute of Islam, the most important mosques in Germany are located in cities such as Hamburg, Berlin, Mannheim, Marl, Dortmund, Cologne, Frankfurt, Wesling, Bonn, Zingen, Fortsheim, as well as mosques. The cities of Aachen and Munich are important mosques in Germany. These mosques are far from the city center and are often located in industrial areas.

Islamic Theological Studies
In 2010, the German Ministry of Education and Research established Islamic Theological Studies as an academic discipline at public universities in order to train teachers for Islamic religious education and Muslim theologians. Since then, Islamic theological departments have been established at several universities, conducting research and teaching on Islam from a theological perspective.

Islamic fundamentalism
Concerns of Islamic fundamentalism came to the fore after 11 September 2001, especially with respect to Islamic fundamentalism among second- and third-generation Muslims in Germany - the Hamburg cell, which included Mohamed Atta, was prominent in the planning and execution of 11 September attacks. Also the various confrontations between Islamic religious law (Sharia) and the norms of German Grundgesetz and culture are the subject of intense debate. German critics include both liberals and Christian groups. The former claim that Islamic fundamentalism violates basic fundamental rights whereas the latter maintain that Germany is a state and society grounded in the Christian tradition.

According to a 2007 Federal Ministry of the Interior report almost half of all young Muslims in Germany support fundamentalist views. About 12% of Muslims in Germany identified with moral-religious criticism against Western societal values in combination with corporal punishment up to and including the death penalty.

According to a 2012 poll, 72% of the Turks in Germany believe that Islam is the only true religion and 46% wish that one day more Muslims live in Germany than Christians. According to a 10-year survey by the University of Bielefeld, which dealt with different aspects of attitudes to Islam, "distrust" of Islam is widespread in Germany with only 19 percent of Germans believing that Islam is compatible with German culture.

According to 2013 study by Social Science Research Center Berlin, two thirds of the Muslims interviewed say that religious rules are more important to them than the laws of the country in which they live, almost 60 percent of the Muslim respondents reject homosexuals as friends; 45 percent think that Jews cannot be trusted; and an equally large group believes that the West is out to destroy Islam (Christian respondents’ answers for comparison: As many as 9 percent are openly anti-Semitic; 13 percent do not want to have homosexuals as friends; and 23 percent think that Muslims aim to destroy Western culture).

According to a 2012 poll, 25% of the Turks in Germany believe atheists are inferior human beings.

Salafism 

Salafism is a part of the Sunni branch of Islam which is a revival of original Islamic ideals. Salafists strive to live exclusively according to the Quran. According to German authorities, Salafism is incompatible with the principles codified in the Constitution of Germany, in particular democracy, the rule of law and a political order based on human rights. According to the German security service, the Salafist movement attracts rising numbers. In 2011 there were an estimated 3800 Salafists in Germany, which rose to 10300 in September 2017. According to head of security office Hans-Georg Maaßen, the Salafist scene in Germany is not dominated by any one single individual, but instead a great many persons have to be monitored.

According to German Federal Agency for Civic Education, the Salafist movement in Germany is centered in the Frankfurt Rhine-Main metropolitan area, North Rhine-Westphalia and Berlin. In these areas, mosques and charismatic imams are the driving factors behind recruitment to the Salafist movement.

In 2016, the interior ministry of North Rhine-Westphalia reported that the number of mosques with a Salafist influence had risen from 30 to 55, which indicated both an actual increase and improved reporting.

In February 2017, the German Salafist mosque organisation Berliner Fussilet-Moscheeverein was banned by authorities. Anis Amri, the perpetrator of the 2016 Berlin truck attack, was said to be among its visitors. In March 2017, the German Muslim community organisation Deutschsprachige Islamkreis Hildesheim was also banned after investigators found that its members were preparing to travel to the conflict zone in Syria to fight for the Islamic State. According to the Federal Agency for Civic Education, these examples show that Salafist mosques not only concern themselves with religious matters, but also prepare serious crimes and terrorist activities.

Islamist scene in Germany
Turkish and Kurdish Islamist groups are also active in Germany, and Turkish and Kurdish Islamists have co-operated in Germany as in the case of the Sauerland terror cell. Political scientist Guido Steinberg stated that many top leaders of Islamist organizations in Turkey fled to Germany in the 2000s, and that the Turkish (Kurdish) Hizbullah has also "left an imprint on Turkish Kurds in Germany." Also many Kurds from Iraq (there are about 50,000 to 80,000 Iraqi Kurds in Germany) financially supported Kurdish-Islamist groups like  Ansar al Islam.  Many Islamists in Germany are ethnic Kurds (Iraqi and Turkish Kurds) or Turks. Before 2006, the German Islamist scene was dominated by Iraqi Kurds and Palestinians, but since 2006 Kurds and Turks from Turkey are dominant.

In 2016, the German security service estimated that about 24 000 Muslims were part of Islamists movements in Germany, of which 10 000 belonged to the Salafist scene.

In 2016, 90 mosques were monitored by the Federal Office for the Protection of the Constitution for their islamist ideology. These were mostly Arabic-language "backyard mosques" where self-appointed imams exhorted their followers to wage jihad.

Since the start of 2017 until April 2018, 80 Islamist extremists without German citizenship were deported to their home countries.

In March 2018, there were 760 islamists in Germany classified as dangerous by police authorities, of which more than half were on German territory and 153 of the latter were in prison.

In recent years, Mosques in Germany have been receiving larger quantities of hate mail as well as threats.

Sharia police trial 
A group of men were walking the streets of Wuppertal carrying vests labelled "Sharia Police". They wanted to talk to young Muslims and discourage them from visiting betting halls, brothels and stop them from drinking alcohol. They were charged with breaching the regulation against carrying political uniforms but were acquitted by the district court in Wuppertal. The prosecutor appealed the decision to the German Federal Court of Justice, which annulled the acquittal in January 2018. In the retrial, the men were convicted and sentenced to pay fines as their garments suggested militancy due to the violent nature of similarly named organisations in the Middle East.

Banning of IHH Germany
In July 2010, Germany outlawed the Internationale Humanitäre Hilfsorganisation e.V. (IHH Germany), saying it had used donations to support Hamas, which is considered by the European Union and Germany to be a terrorist organization, while presenting their activities to donors as humanitarian help. German Interior Minister Thomas de Maiziere said, "Donations to so-called social welfare groups belonging to Hamas, such as the millions given by IHH, actually support the terror organization Hamas as a whole." IHH e.V. was believed by the German Authorities to have collected money in mosques and to have sent $8.3 million to organizations related to Hamas.

Religiosity of young Muslims 
Studies show that while not all Muslims are religious, Muslim youths are markedly more religious than non-Muslim youths. A study comparing Turkish Muslim youths living in Germany and German youth found that the former were more likely to attend religious services regularly (35% versus 14%).

41% of young Turkish Muslim boys and 52% of the girls said they prayed "sometimes or regularly"; 64% of boys and 74% of girls said they wanted to teach their children religion.

Notable Germans immigrants

Categories 
 List of Turkish Germans
 List of German people of Kurdish descent
 List of German people of Moroccan descent
 List of German people of Lebanese descent
 List of German people of Iranian descent
 List of German people of Palestinian descent

Rest 

Vaneeza Ahmad, Pakistani-German model
Laith Al-Deen, German singer
Mehmed Ali Pasha (marshal) was a German-born Ottoman soldier
Nadiem Amiri, German professional footballer
Azet, German rapper
Kristiane Backer, German television presenter, television journalist and author
Danny Blum, German Soccer player
Bushido, German rapper
Denis Cuspert, German militant Islamist and former rapper
Mahmoud Dahoud, football player
Ibrahim El-Zayat, European Muslim activist in Germany and has been a functionary in many important Islamic organizations in Germany, Europe, and Saudi Arabia.
Cemile Giousouf, German politician and a member of the German parliament Bundestag
Fritz Grobba was a German diplomat during the interwar period and World War II
Karim Guédé, football player
Kollegah, German rapper
Murad Wilfried Hofmann, prominent German diplomat and author
Hadayatullah Hübsch German writer and journalist
Lamya Kaddor German writer and known for introducing Islamic education in German in public schools in Germany
Jawed Karim, German-American Internet entrepreneur
Elsa Kazi was a German writer of one-act plays, short stories, novels and history, and a poet
Hasnain Kazim, author and journalist, correspondent of the German news magazine Der Spiegel and Spiegel Online
Rani Khedira, football player
Sami Khedira, German Soccer player
Sead Kolašinac, Bosnian professional footballer
Mojib Latif, Professor, meteorologist and oceanographer
Johann von Leers was a member of the Waffen SS in Nazi Germany, where he was also a professor known for his anti-Jewish polemics
Jamal Malik, Professor of Islamic Studies and chair of Religious Studies, University of Erfurt, Germany
Shkodran Mustafi, German professional footballer
Nash, German rapper
Adam Neuser was a popular pastor and theologian
Morsal Obeidi, murder victim, of Afghan origin
Nura Habib Omer, German rapper
Susanne Osthoff, German archaeologist
Leroy Sané, German football player
Annemarie Schimmel
Adel Tawil, German singer
Bassam Tibi, political scientist and Professor of International Relations
Pierre Vogel (born 1978), also known as Abu Hamza, German Salafi Islamist preacher and former professional boxer
 Linda Wenzel, German schoolgirl who went missing in 2016 after converting to Islam and joining Islamic State of Iraq and the Levant

See also

Islamic Centre Hamburg
Islamic dress in Europe
List of mosques in Germany
Religion in Germany
Turks in Germany
Demographics of Germany

Footnotes

References

Further reading

External links
 Ahmadiyya Muslim Community Deutschland
Links: Islam in Germany
Germany: European Muslim Union with its offices in Granada, Spain, Bonn, Istanbul and Sarajevo
A German Initiative to Bridge the Gap

 
Germany